Štikovo is a small village in the Šibenik-Knin County, Croatia. 

Village is located in inland Dalmatia, halfway between towns of Vrlika and Drniš. 
Štikovo has a population of 82, both Serbs and Croats. Before the Croatian War of Independence in 1991, Štikovo had population of 360. 324 of them were Serbs, 30 were Croats.

See also
Vrlika
Drniš

References 

Populated places in Šibenik-Knin County